The Grantham Formation is a geological formation in England, which dates to the Middle Jurassic Aalenian age around 172 million years ago. It is composed of mudstones and sandstone, usually with abundant plant debris. It overlies the preceding Northampton Sand Formation and underlies the following Lincolnshire Limestone.

It is found from the River Humber to the Kettering/Peterborough area.

References

Aalenian Stage
Formation
Jurassic England
Jurassic System of Europe